Vojtech Neményi (1 August 1899 – 7 April 1945) was a Slovak water polo player. He competed in the men's tournament at the 1924 Summer Olympics.

References

External links
 

1899 births
1945 deaths
Slovak male water polo players
Olympic water polo players of Czechoslovakia
Water polo players at the 1924 Summer Olympics
Sportspeople from Košice
Czechoslovak people who died in the Holocaust